Bird Mother is an action game developed by Novotrade (Andromeda Software) and published by Creative Sparks for the Commodore 64 in 1984. It was not ported to other systems.

Gameplay
As the Bird Mother the player must collect twigs to build a nest then lay three eggs in it once it has been completed. The next task is to catch flying insects to provide food for the offspring which have now hatched. They must also be defended from attacks by moving them around. The final challenge is to teach the young birds to fly. When this has been done the game progresses to a higher difficulty level.

Reception

Bird Mother received review scores of 26/40 from Personal Computer Games and 33/40 from Computer & Video Games.

References

1984 video games
Action video games
Single-player video games
Commodore 64 games
Commodore 64-only games
Video games featuring female protagonists
Video games about birds
Video games about children
Video games about families
Video games set in forests
Video games developed in Hungary